A great comet is a comet that becomes exceptionally bright. There is no official definition; often the term is attached to comets such as Halley's Comet, which during certain appearances are bright enough to be noticed by casual observers who are not looking for them, and become well known outside the astronomical community. Great comets appear at irregular, unpredictable intervals, on average about once per decade. Although comets are officially named after their discoverers, great comets are sometimes also referred to by the year in which they appeared great, using the formulation "The Great Comet of ...", followed by the year.

Causes 

The vast majority of comets are never bright enough to be seen by the naked eye, and generally pass through the inner Solar System unseen by anyone except astronomers. However, occasionally a comet may brighten to naked eye visibility, and even more rarely it may become as bright as or brighter than the brightest stars. The requirements for this to occur are: a large and active nucleus, a close approach to the Sun, and a close approach to the Earth. A comet fulfilling all three of these criteria will certainly be  very bright. Sometimes, a comet failing on one criterion will still be bright. For example, Comet Hale–Bopp did not approach the Sun very closely, but had an exceptionally large and active nucleus. It was visible to the naked eye for several months and was very widely observed. Similarly, Comet Hyakutake was a relatively small comet, but appeared bright because it passed very close to the Earth.

Size and activity of the nucleus 
Cometary nuclei vary in size from a few hundreds of metres across or less to many kilometres across. When they approach the Sun, large amounts of gas and dust are ejected by cometary nuclei, due to solar heating. A crucial factor in how bright a comet becomes is how large and how active its nucleus is. After many returns to the inner Solar System, cometary nuclei become depleted in volatile materials and thus are much less bright than comets which are making their first passage through the Solar System.

The sudden brightening of Comet Holmes in 2007 showed the importance of the activity of the nucleus in the comet's brightness. On October 23–24, 2007, the comet underwent a sudden outburst which caused it to brighten by factor of about half a million. It unexpectedly brightened from an apparent magnitude of about 17 to about 2.8 in a period of only 42 hours, making it visible to the naked eye. All these temporarily made comet 17P the largest (by radius) object in the Solar System although its nucleus is estimated to be only about 3.4 km in diameter.

Close perihelion approach 
The brightness of a simple reflective body varies with the inverse square of its distance from the Sun. That is, if an object's distance from the Sun is halved, its brightness is quadrupled. However, comets behave differently, due to their ejection of large amounts of volatile gas which then also reflect sunlight and may also fluoresce. Their brightness varies roughly as the inverse cube of their distance from the Sun, meaning that if a comet's distance from the Sun is halved, it will become eight times as bright.

This means that the peak brightness of a comet depends significantly on its distance from the Sun. For most comets, the perihelion of their orbit lies outside the Earth's orbit. Any comet approaching the Sun to within  or less may have a chance of becoming a great comet.

Close approach to the Earth 

For a comet to become very bright, it also needs to pass close to the Earth. Halley's Comet, for example, is usually very bright when it passes through the inner Solar System every seventy-six years, but during its 1986 apparition, its closest approach to Earth was almost the most distant possible. The comet became visible to the naked eye, but was unspectacular. On the other hand, the intrinsically small and faint Comet Hyakutake (C/1996 B2) appeared very bright and spectacular due to its very close approach to Earth at its nearest during March 1996.

List of great comets 

Great comets of the past two millennia include the following:

 Unnamed – 373–372 BC
 Halley's Comet – 87 BC
 Caesar's Comet – 44 BC
 Halley's Comet – 12 BC
 Halley's Comet – 1066
 Great Comet of 1106
 Great Comet of 1264
 Great Comet of 1402
 Great Comet of 1556
 Great Comet of 1577
 Great Comet of 1618
 Great Comet of 1680
 Great Comet of 1744
 Great Comet of 1811
 Great Comet of 1819
 Great Comet of 1843
 Great Comet of 1844
 Donati's Comet – 1858
 Great Comet of 1861
 Coggia's Comet – 1874
 Great Comet of 1882
 Great Comet of 1901
 Great January Comet of 1910
 Halley's Comet – 1910
 Comet Skjellerup–Maristany – 1927
 Comet Arend–Roland – 1957
 Comet Mrkos – 1957
 Comet Seki-Lines – 1962
 Comet Ikeya–Seki – 1965
 Comet Bennett – 1970
 Comet West – 1976
 Comet Hyakutake – 1996
 Comet Hale–Bopp – 1997
 Comet McNaught – 2007

Notes

External links 
 The bright-comet chronicles. John E. Bortle (W. R. Brooks Observatory)
 Memorable Comets of the Past Gary W. Kronk.
 Brightest comets seen since 1935

Comets
Astronomical events
Observational astronomy
Light sources
Great comets